The Musician at the Dragon Citadel is a 2010 Vietnamese film based on Nguyễn Du's poem, Long thành cầm giả ca, for the Millennial Anniversary of Hanoi directed by Đào Bá Sơn. The film won the Golden Kite Prize for Best Feature Film, as well as Best Director, Actor, Editing, and Costuming.

Plot
The film opens with a scene of a little girl named Gái (Girl) reflecting in the village well. The girl was born in a peaceful countryside, whose mother used to be a singer, so she had to follow in her mother's footsteps. An acquaintance brought her to Thăng Long Citadel (Present-day Hà Nội) to learn how to play the đàn nguyệt, she became a student of Master Nguyễn and was given a courtesy name (The name was Cầm). From the first time Master Nguyễn had met Cầm, Master Nguyễn saw in her, a special talent, her playing of the đàn nguyệt shows more emotion than her other counterparts. One day, a rebellion broke out and caused Cầm to leave Thăng Long (Hanoi). The poet Tố Như (Nguyễn Du) meets Cầm and they fall in love. But he already has a wife, and doesn't want to be with her, even when he meets her several times and has intimate sexual encounters with her later. Cầm wonders around aimlessly until she reached her hometown. During this time, the Qing Dynasty invaded Vietnam and a Qing mandarin had captured her along with other people in her hometown. And the mandarin had forced her to play music for him. The Tây Sơn army ambushed the Qing garrison which allowed for Cầm to escape. After this, Cầm becomes a famous singer, while Tố Như began writing poems. Many years later, the two meet when they are both old, feeling sorry, he writes a poem (Long thành cầm giả ca) for her, and she jumps into a well (commits suicide). The movie ends with the narrator saying that on nights when the moonlight shines, people can hear mysterious sounds of a musical instrument coming from the well

Poem 
The movie itself is based on Nguyễn Du's poem, Long thành cầm giả ca, where he writes about a beautiful female musician who lives in the Dragon Citadel (Long thành; Hanoi). The original poem was written in văn ngon (literary Chinese), but has been translated into Vietnamese. 

In the ending credits, the song heard is lines 249-263 of the Tale of Kiều,

Cast

 Quách Ngọc Ngoan as Tố Như
 Nhật Kim Anh as Cầm / Gái (Lady)
 Hà Anh as Cầm / Gái lúc nhỏ (Young Girl)
 Trần Lực as Nguyễn Khản
 Bùi Bài Bình as Thùy Trung Hầu
 Đỗ Kỷ as Nguyễn Đề
 Mai Thành as Thầy Nguyễn
 Nguyễn Anh Quang as Lý An Quân
 Thi Nhung as Dì Xinh
 Trần Hạnh as Ông lão kéo vó

References

External links
 

Vietnamese drama films
Vietnamese musical films
2010 films
Films based on poems